Ashly Audio is an American audio equipment company founded by Bill Thompson and Dave Malloy in 1974. Ashly produces over 40 products, including amplifiers, mixers, equalizers, digital and analog audio processors, for the recording and live sound industries. Ashly Audio is a division of Canadian corporate group Exertis | JAM.

History

1960-1976
Ashly Audio, Inc. was started as a live sound reinforcement company until the founders began producing their own equipment.  The company was named after a founder, Larry Ashley, who did not continue with the company into their era of equipment production when they became a corporation in 1974.

Demand for the components used in Ashly's mixers caused the company to develop their equipment in a modular fashion.  Their first successful product came in 1976, when they developed the SC-66 stereo parametric equalizer.  It was a hit and Ashly changed their focus as a company toward developing modular rack gear.

1977-present
Ashly developed power amplifiers using MOS-FET technology. Their amplifiers were the first to be approved by Lucasfilm for THX certified movie theater sound systems. Later developments included the Ashly Protea and multichannel power amplifiers.

In 2008, Ashly Audio was sold to the Canadian audio distribution company JAM Industries, which rebranded as Exertis | JAM in 2021.

References

External links
 

Manufacturers of professional audio equipment
JAM Industries
Manufacturing companies based in New York (state)
Companies based in Monroe County, New York
American companies established in 1976
Manufacturing companies established in 1976
1976 establishments in New York (state)
Audio equipment manufacturers of the United States